Accabre Huntley (born 1967) is a British poet of Guyanese parentage. She became a published poet as a child, and has performed nationally and internationally on radio and television.

Life
Accabre Huntley – named after one of the rebels in the 18th-century Berbice revolt – was born in London in 1967, the daughter of the activists and publishers Jessica Huntley and Eric Huntley, who founded Bogle L'Ouverture Publications in 1969. At the age of seven she wrote a poem about suffering racist abuse that was published by Valerie Sinason, who was then doing therapeutic work with children in East London. At the age of nine or ten she published a book of poems, At School Today, with Bogle L'Ouverture. While studying at Reynolds High School in Acton, London, she published her second poetry collection, Easter Monday Blues.

Huntley's work has been anthologised in collections including James Berry's News from Babylon (1984) and children's anthologies like Grace Nichol's Black Poetry (1988).

She leads poetry workshops in schools, and is a member of the Poetry Society's Poets in Schools scheme and the Poetry Society's Examinations Department Advisory Group.

Works
 At School Today. Ealing: Bogle-L'Ouverture, 1977.
 Easter Monday Blues. Ealing: Bogle-L'Ouverture, 1983.

References

External links
 Accabre Huntley at the Spoken Word Archive

1967 births
Living people
British poets
British women poets
English people of Guyanese descent
Photography exhibitions